The Pocket Canons is the name of a series of small books, designed by Pentagram Partner, Angus Hyland,  featuring the text of individual Books of the Bible along with introductions by various well-known authors and public figures, including the Dalai Lama and Bono. The Bible texts are drawn from the King James Version of the Bible. The series was conceived by Matthew Darby, who published it in partnership with Canongate Books in the UK. The series has now (2006) been published in 12 languages and in 16 countries, selling well over a million copies.  The US publisher of the Pocket Canons is Grove/Atlantic Inc.

Pocket Canons: Series 1

Pocket Canons: Series 2

Further reading
Second Coming in Salon
The Gospel According to Stephen King? in Businessweek

Series of books
Study Bibles
King James Version editions
Canongate Books books